Ekra Sar (also Romanized as Ekrā Sar) is a village in Jennat Rudbar Rural District, in the Central District of Ramsar County, Mazandaran Province, Iran. At the 2006 census, its population was 15, in six families.

References 

Populated places in Ramsar County